HZT may refer to:
 Air Horizon, a Togolese airline
 High-Z Supernova Search Team
 Hydrochlorothiazide